Iris Rocio Falcón Lurita (born November 1, 1973) is a retired female volleyball player from Peru, who twice represented her native country at the Summer Olympics,  in 1996 and 2000. She also competed at the 1998 FIVB World Championship.

Career
Falcón played in the 1996 Olympic Games and the 2000 Olympic Games ranking in the 11th place. She ranked in ninth place in the 1998 World Championship.

References
 Profile

1973 births
Living people
Peruvian women's volleyball players
Olympic volleyball players of Peru
Volleyball players at the 1996 Summer Olympics
Volleyball players at the 2000 Summer Olympics
20th-century Peruvian women